Sam Bass may refer to:

Sam Bass (outlaw) (1851–1878), American train robber and outlaw
Sam Bass (politician) (born 1944), Australian politician
Sam Bass (artist) (1961–2019), American sports artist
Sam Bass Hollow, a valley in Texas
Sam Bass, the founder of the Canadian drugstore chain London Drugs
 Samuel Bass (abolitionist), Canadian-American abolitionist who helped Solomon Northup attain freedom

Bass, Sam